William "Stafford" Jones, from Gainesville, Florida, has been implicated in a 2012 scandal involving drawing district lines in favor of Republicans. Jones was on the Florida state delegation for the 2020 Republican National Convention and was a longtime the Chairman of Alachua County Republican Party.

Jones is known for creating dozens of political action committees that have spent millions of dollars in Florida state elections. In 2021, the nonpartisan watchdog organization Citizens for Responsibility and Ethics in Washington reported that two of Jones' organizations falsely reported on their tax returns that they engaged in no political activities and failed to disclose more than $1 million in political contributions. Florida Democrats have complained that Jones' organizations have funded spoiler candidates and used deceptive tactics.

In 2012, Jones was a key figure in redrawing Florida's congressional districts that the Florida Supreme Court declared unconstitutional because they were gerrymandered with "partisan intent." Jones helped find citizens to submit maps during the redistricting process that had been pre-drawn by Republican consultants and to provide scripted public comment based on Republican talking points.

References 

Living people
Politics of Florida
Year of birth missing (living people)